Francis John Doyle (born in 1897 in Noorat) was an Australian clergyman and bishop for the Roman Catholic Diocese of Alotau-Sideia. He was appointed bishop in 1966. Doyle retired in 1970 and died in 1973 in Port Moresby.

References 

1897 births
1973 deaths
Australian Roman Catholic bishops
Roman Catholic bishops of Alotau-Sideia